Dinner and a Movie is the sixth studio album by American rapper Brotha Lynch Hung. It was released on March 23, 2010, by Strange Music.

Commercial performance
The album debuted at number 69 on the US Billboard 200, selling 7,900 copies in its first week of release. It is his best debut on the charts since his album Loaded (1997). Dinner and a Movie sold 3,100 copies in its second week of sales, bringing total sales to 11,000 copies. According to an interview with the Strange Music Travis O’Guin, the album was under-shipped by retailers. Strange Music was planning to have this shipped between 35,000 and 40,000 copies, and yet it only have sold 12,120 units that were shipped due to difficulties with their distributor, Universal Fontana. To date, the album has sold over 45,000 copies in the US.

Critical reception

Dinner and a Movie received critical acclaim from music critics. David Jeffries of Allmusic remarked that Brotha Lynch Hung is "not only on top of his game on this 2010 effort, but he’s also found a perfect match when it comes to labels." Jeffries also praised the plot, mentioning that the story "goes from gross to scary to sympathetic and personal, and then back again, all without losing a step or trying your patience." HipHopDX also gave the album a positive review, saying that its "honesty and delivery that mixes with the horror make this album both a brilliant comeback story, and a career milestone." iHipHop affirmed this, describing Dinner and a Movie as "one of the best albums of 2010 thus far, and is easily the most polished effort in Brother Lynch Hung's catalogue." All three reviewers gave the album  four stars out of five.

Track listing

Chart positions

References

External links
 Official album website

2010 albums
Brotha Lynch Hung albums
Albums produced by Seven (record producer)
Concept albums
Rap operas
Strange Music albums